Benato - Toby is a town and commune in Madagascar. It belongs to the district of Betroka, which is a part of Anosy Region. The population of the commune was estimated to be approximately 9,000 in 2001 commune census.

Only primary schooling is available. It is also a site of industrial-scale  mining. The majority 50% of the population of the commune are farmers, while an additional 40% receives their livelihood from raising livestock. The most important crop is rice, while other important products are maize and cassava. Services provide employment for 10% of the population.

References and notes 

Populated places in Anosy